Twin Bridge may refer to:

Twin Bridge (Fayette, Iowa), listed on the National Register of Historic Places in Fayette County, Iowa
Twin Bridge (Brownlee, Nebraska), listed on the National Register of Historic Places in Cherry County, Nebraska

See also
 I-10 Twin Span Bridge, connecting New Orleans to Slidell, Louisiana
 McClay's Twin Bridge (East), a historic bridge in Franklin County, Pennsylvania
 McClay's Twin Bridge (West), a historic bridge in Franklin County, Pennsylvania
 Twin Bridges (disambiguation)